The Central District of Saqqez County is a district (bakhsh) in Saqqez County, Kurdistan Province, Iran. At the 2006 census, its population was 163,999, in 37,714 families.  The district has one city: Saqqez. The District has four rural districts (dehestan): Mir Deh Rural District, Sara Rural District, Tamugheh Rural District, and Torjan Rural District.
Seqiz is a Kurdish city on the Zagros mountains in Iran. This city Seqiz was once the Scythian capital.

General information 
Seqiz is situated on the banks of the Seqiz river in the north-western part of Iran, south west of the Urmiye lake, on the Zagros mountains. Seqiz was originally found during the first Med empire, and at that time was called Izirta/Izirna. As the city was a Median capital, army bases, temples, and forts were built in the surrounding sites (Zewiye, Qeplantu, Aramait). When Sarken II the Assyrian king concurred Izirta, he ordered the destruction of the city, and consequently when rebuilt by the Scythians, Seqiz was renamed to Seka, later to Sakiz, and the final deformation of the name became Seqiz. 
Historically religious importance of Seqiz is evident given that two important Mannai, and Sassanid temples are located in the proximity. The latter was particularly prominent, as it is believed that the Sassanid kings were traveling to this temple by foot once a year. Various forms of folklore tales, and songs, further add that natives of this region were generally Zoroastrians. 
Not long time ago, the "modern" Seqiz was reconstructed on two major hills separated by Weli Xan river. This divides the city into two major parts, Naw Qela and Serpeche. Naw Qela (The Fort) hosted an ancient fort on a height, indicating that this has been a possible place of ancient rulers. Till very recently the fort was used for public ceremonies, particularly at the new year (Newroz) evenings, fireworks along with traditional games were organized. 
The geographical position of Seqiz endow particular up to date importance. 200 km from Sine (Sanandaj), 60 km from Bane (Baneh), 33 km from Bokan, and 139 km from Meriwan. These cities are links to four distinctly different kurdish regions, and this fact has given arise to a well balanced influence of cultural nuances. The cultural life in Seqiz is very rich and plays a pivotal role for other kurdish regions. Musically, activities in Seqiz have been of primary importance for development of singers such as Hesen Zirek, Qale Mare, Mezher Xaleqi, Naser Rezazi, and native musicians such as Zeze brothers, Sei Muhammad Safai and Muhammad Nahid.

Geography 
Seqiz lies on 36.2° N 46.3° E, and its average height is about 1500 meters (4900 feet) above sea level. This make the climate very rough and varying, as it is very hot in summer (up to 40 °C) and very cold in winter (down to -30 °C).

Water resources 
Chemî Gewre: This river is the largest water resource in the Seqiz area. It originates from the Gerdeneî Xan, Shêx Shwan, Qulqule, and Pîr Emran mountains, and spans over major parts of the south-west region of Seqiz country side. It passes Gile Shîn, Qure Derre, Mîre De, Chîra Weîs, Belece, Temuxe, Qebexlû, Elî Awa, Xeîber and Kanî Cejnî villages and passing through Pir Wenis grounds, it ends in Legzi Dam. 
Chemî Cexetû: Originating from Hermê Dol, Kanî Temîrxan, Bestam, Sey Awa, Kanî Tela, Werenan, Kes Nezan, Kanî Sef, Kute Resh, and Tewe Kilan mountains, and after passing through villages such as Agce Goce, Bestam, Digaga, Xushe Dire, Dire Zîaret, Tale Cer, Hesen Selaran, Merze, Renge Rejan, Qela Cuxe, and Dire Sileman, this river also ends attached to the Legzi Dam. 
Chemî Xurxure: This river starts form Chil Cheme (at the north west of Xurxure), Dere Hwan, Ezîz Awa, Cafir Xan, Dire Wiyan Wishke, Tîkanlu, Kewe Kanî, Mîran, Nergîle, Îshaq Awa, Mewlan Awa, and Chemî Pîr Sîleman heights. This river passes through Mowlan Awa, Xurxure, Shexle, Chinare, Kerîm Awa, Qire Gil, Tîkanlu, Sey Awa, Kele Gewre, and Zulfîle villages and like many other rivers ends attached to the Legzi Dam. 
Chemî Sarûq: This river separates Seqiz from Tîkab and originates from Kereftu, Kanî De Hewshar, Ax Dîrem, Kerim Awa, Înche, Rehîm Awa, and Elî Awa height and after passing through grounds of the Kuche Tela, Taze Awa, and Qurxan villages, in the surroundings of Yemen Awa, this river connects to Chemî Gewre. 
Chemî Tatahu: Originates from the heights of Mengur, Turcan, Seqiz, and Bane, and hosting many sub branches, this river cuts the Mehabad connection at west of Mîanduaw, and connects to the south part os Urmiyeh Lake.

Mountains
The highest and most prominent of the mountains in the Seqiz area are situated in the Sershîw and Xurxure regions. These mountains are extremely rich natural resources, and host many mines. A brief list includes:

Biranan                (2640m)          Nekeroz proximity

 

 

	 

Qelega                              between Mêrke Neqshe and Gwêze

Sertun                              Mîredê and Xapuredê proximity

Mela Mehmud                         Dozexere proximity

Berde Resh                          Dere Ziyaret proximity

Asman Bilaxî                        Henge Chine proximity

Gewreqela                           Hermê Dil proximity

Xesrewxan                           Qamîshle proximity

Degaga                              Degaga proximity

Hewt Tewanan                        7 km from Zêwiye

Mehmu Shaîer                        Kele Shîn proximity

Qereqa                              Shêx Shwan proximity

Ewil Rezaq                          Xurxure proximity

Tenge Esihab                        Xurxure proximity

Bextiyar                            Sershîw proximity

Shîrîn Sware                        Berde Resh proximity

References 

Saqqez County
Districts of Kurdistan Province